Konrad Sasse (3 October 1926 – 22 July 1981) was a German musicologist and Handel scholar.

Life 
Sasse was born in Wernigerode. After completing his Abitur in 1946 at the Fürst-Otto-Gymnasium in Wernigerode in the Harz, he studied musicology among others with Max Schneider and Walther Siegmund-Schultze at the Martin-Luther-University Halle-Wittenberg from 1948 to 1954, which he completed with the Staatsexamen and obtained his doctorate with a thesis on Robert Franz (1962). The work was revised and edited by Edwin Werner in 1986.

From 1954 to 1956, Sasse was secretary at the Handel Festival, Halle. From 1956 to 1981 he was director of the Handel House in Halle.

From 1963 to 1968, he was head of the instrumentology working group within the Society for Music Research. From 1967 to 1971, he was president of the GDR country group of the International Association of Music Libraries, Archives and Documentation Centres. Until 1974, he was also a member of the presidium. From 1971, he was also a lecturer for organology at the Humboldt University Berlin and the Martin Luther University Halle-Wittenberg.

He is the author of numerous relevant publications, including a Handel bibliography and studies on opera.

Sasse died in Dessau at the age of 54.

Awards 
 Handel Prize of the Bezirk Halle (1960)
 Johannes-R.-Becher-Medaille in Silver (1962)

Publications 
 Das Händel-Haus in Halle. Geburtshaus Georg Friedrich Händels. Geschichte und Führer durch die Ausstellungen. Händel-Haus, Halle an der Saale 1958.
 Händel-Bibliographie. Deutscher Verlag für Musik VEB, Leipzig 1963.
 Beiträge zur Forschung über Leben und Werk von Robert Franz 1815–1892 (Schriften des Händelhauses in Halle. Vol. 4). Händel-Haus, Halle an der Saale 1986 – edited and published by Edwin Werner.
 'Neue Daten zu Johann Christoph Schmidt', HJb 1957, 115–25
 ed.: ‘Opera Register from 1712 to 1734 (Colman-Register)’, HJb 1959, 199–223
 Katalog zu den Sammlungen des Händel-Hauses in Halle, 1–7 (Halle, 1961–80)
 Halle an der Saale: Musik (Halle, 1968)

References

Further reading 
 Gabriele Baumgartner: Sasse, Konrad. In Gabriele Baumgartner, Dieter Hebig (ed.): Biographisches Handbuch der SBZ / DDR 1945–1990. VOl. 2: Maassen – Zylla. K. G. Saur Verlag, Munich among others 1997, .

External links 
 
 

20th-century German musicologists
Directors of museums in Germany
German music historians
1926 births
1981 deaths
People from Wernigerode